Bossiaea peninsularis is a species of flowering plant in the family Fabaceae and is endemic to the Eyre Peninsula in South Australia. It is an erect rhizome-forming, more or less leafless shrub with leaves reduced to small scales, and yellow, red and purplish flowers.

Description
Flowering occurs from August to October and the fruit is a pod.

Taxonomy and naming
Bossiaea peninsularis was first formally described in 2012 by Ian R. Thompson in the journal Muelleria from specimens collected near Karkoo in 2000. The specific epithet (peninsularis) means egg-shaped with the widest part above the middle, referring to the shape of the leaves.

Distribution and habitat
This bossiaea grows in mallee woodland on the Eyre Peninsula in South Australia.

References

peninsularis
Flora of South Australia
Plants described in 2012